The Battle of Calabria, known to the Italian Navy as the Battle of Punta Stilo, was a naval battle during the Battle of the Mediterranean in the Second World War. Ships of the Italian Regia Marina were opposed by vessels of the British Royal Navy and Royal Australian Navy. The battle occurred 30 miles to the east of Punta Stilo, Calabria, on 9 July 1940. It was one of the few pitched battles of the Mediterranean campaign during the Second World War involving large numbers of ships on both sides. Both sides claimed victory, but in fact the battle was a draw and everyone returned to their bases safely.

Background
When Italy entered the Second World War, its forces in Libya were ill-equipped for offensive operations, and the Italian fleet was forced to start large supply convoys in order to bring them up to fighting condition.

On 6 July a convoy of four merchant ships left Naples on their way to Benghazi, while attempting to fool the Allies into thinking they were making for Tripoli. That evening two torpedo-boats from Catania and another freighter met them off Messina and the next day their escort force joined the convoy from Taranto after being informed that the Allies had recently left port in Alexandria. The transports carried 2,190 troops, 72 M11 tanks, 232 other vehicles, 10,445 tons of supplies and 5,720 tons of fuel. The convoy's escort, commanded by Admiral Inigo Campioni, consisted of three groups. The first, comprising four destroyers and six torpedo boats, sailed directly protecting the cargo ships. A second group sailed  to the east consisting of six heavy cruisers and another four destroyers. Finally, the main battle group consisted of two battleships ( and ), eight light cruisers and another 16 destroyers. A substantial number of the Italian destroyers didn't take part in the battle due to mechanical problems and the need to refuel.

Meanwhile, the Allies were involved in a similar convoy action. The fleet sailed from Alexandria bound towards Malta where the destroyers would deliver supplies and a limited number of specialist reinforcements. Two convoys were arranged to take off fleet stores and civilians from Malta to Alexandria. One of them, had to return to Alexandria with a burst steam pipe on the early hours of 8 July. All were under the direction of Admiral Andrew Cunningham.

At 14:40 on 8 July two Italian Cant Z.506 seaplanes from Tobruk spotted the British fleet and shadowed it for nearly four hours. Admiral Campioni ordered his fleet to defend the convoy by turning eastward and preparing for action. The Italian Supreme Command, however, was reluctant to risk its warships in a night-time encounter, and they ordered the fleet to avoid contact. During the initial positioning the Italians suffered technical problems on three destroyers and two light cruisers, so these ships, with several additional destroyers, were detached to refuel in Sicily. In order to make up for these "losses", another destroyer group was summoned from Taranto. At this point, the Italian fleet had 16 destroyers.

Meanwhile, the Allies were having problems as well. From 10:00 to 18.40, 72 land-based bombers of the Italian  (Royal Air Force) from the mainland attacked their fleet. Unlike the dive-bombers favored by the Germans, Italian bombers operated in formations at high altitudes during the early stages of the war, about 12,000 feet. While scores of bombs were dropped by the Italians, a single hit on  represented the outcome of two major attacks. This was a serious hit on the bridge, killing the captain, six officers and eleven ratings. In addition, three officers and six ratings were wounded. The forward fire control and the steering equipment was destroyed, and for the rest of the battle, she would be commanded from the emergency station.

At 15:10 on 8 July, Cunningham's fleet steamed toward Taranto, in order to cut the Italians' return route. At dusk, Cunningham changed course from 310° to 260° and slowed the fleet speed. During the first hours of 9 July, they took a 305° course, to avoid the Italian air reconnaissance while keeping their fleet between the Italian squadron and the Gulf of Taranto. By 12:30, the Italian Supreme Command was unaware of the situation of the British fleet. Campioni eventually received reports of the British position at 13:30, and six Ro.43 floatplanes launched shortly after by the Italian cruisers spotted the British warships 30 miles closer than supposed.

By late evening of 8 July, the Italian convoy had arrived in Bengazi unscathed.

Battle

Cruiser engagement
Vice Admiral Cunningham could not close the distance to engage with the significantly slower Royal Sovereign and Malaya ( vs ) and took Warspite in on its own. Meanwhile, at 13:15, Eagle launched several unsuccessful sorties by Fairey Swordfish against the Italian heavy cruisers, which they mistook for battleships. At 13:10, the Italian Supreme Command had instructed Campioni to engage one of the two enemy forces facing him, but in fact they had planned to keep the action close to Italy and were deliberately moving north in order to draw the Allies closer to their airbases. By 14:00, however, Cunningham's plans to cut off the Italian fleet from Taranto had succeeded.

Italian rangefinding was better than the Allied, and within three minutes they had found the distance even though they were firing at extreme range. Although the Allies' rangefinding was not as good and they had trouble with their rounds falling short, the Allied gunlaying was better and they were able to place their rounds in much tighter groups. Generally the gunnery of the two forces was fairly well matched. However, by 15:22, the Italian fire came dangerously close to the Allied cruisers and Vice Admiral John Tovey decided to disengage. At this point splinters from a  shell fired by the cruiser  hit , damaging her catapult and the reconnaissance aircraft beyond repair. The cruisers continued to open the range and by 15:30 fire ceased.

Battleship engagement
However, by this time Warspite was also out of position, and she circled in place in order to allow Malaya to catch up. Meanwhile, Royal Sovereign was still well to the rear.

The Italian commander decided to take on Warspite, and started moving his two battleships into position. Conte di Cavour held her fire, as Italian doctrine was for battleships to fight one-on-one. It had been discovered during the Battle of Jutland that more than one ship firing at a single target made it very difficult for the rangefinding parties to tell which rounds were fired by their ship. Conte di Cavour had been assigned to Malaya and Royal Sovereign, which did not enter the engagement.

Warspite, not aware of the Italian firing patterns, split her guns between the two ships. At 15:54 Malaya started firing, well out of range, hoping to cause some confusion on the Italian ships. Meanwhile, the Italian heavy cruisers came into action and started firing on Warspite at 15:55 but had to break off as the Allied cruisers returned.

At 15:59 two shells from Giulio Cesare fell very close to Warspite. Almost immediately after, one of Warspites  rounds hit the rear deck of Giulio Cesare, exploding in the funnel, and setting off the stored ammunition for one of her  anti-aircraft guns. Two seamen were killed and several wounded. The fumes from the burning ammunition were sucked down into the engine room, which had to evacuate and shut down half of the boilers. Giulio Cesares speed quickly fell off to 18 knots and Conte di Cavour took over.

It would appear that Warspite was in an excellent position to deal some serious blows to the slowing Giulio Cesare, but she once again executed another tight turn to allow Malaya to catch up. With her guns suddenly silenced during the turn, rangefinders on Malaya discovered what the Italians had been intending to avoid, that her rounds were falling  short of Giulio Cesare and they had been watching Warspites rounds, not their own.

At 16:01 the Italian destroyers generated smoke and the battleships got under cover. There is some debate about this point today, the Allied position being that the battleships were leaving battle, the Italian that they were attempting to make a torpedo attack with their destroyers from within the smoke.

Final actions
Firing continued as both groups attempted to form up and at 16:07 Bolzano was hit three times by 6-inch shells from HMS Neptune, temporarily locking her rudder and causing two fatalities in the torpedo room. A near miss on the destroyer  caused minor damage.

Meanwhile, mechanics on Giulio Cesare were able to repair two of the four damaged boilers, allowing the battleship to reach . Admiral Campioni, considering the possibility of his remaining battleship, Conte di Cavour, having to face three enemy battleships and an aircraft carrier, decided to withdraw the battleships towards Messina. Giulio Cesare was out of action for 30 days.

Over the next hour both fleets attempted to make long-range torpedo runs with their destroyer groups, without success. At 16:40, the Italian air force made an attack with 126 aircraft, reporting damage on Eagle, Warspite and Malaya; because of some misunderstanding, 50 of the Italian aircraft also attacked the Italian ships, without damage. The battle ended at 16:50 with both sides withdrawing.

One final victim was the destroyer , sent to Augusta in Sicily, which was hit by a torpedo launched from a Swordfish at 09:40 the next day and sank in shallow water. She was refloated and returned to service in December 1941.)

Aftermath
After the battle both fleets turned for home. This allowed the Italians to claim a victory of sorts, as their cargo ships were already past the action by this time and sailed safely for Libya. Meanwhile, the Allied ships also reached Alexandria along with their escort. Although the battle was indecisive, Allied sources claimed that the Royal Navy asserted an important "moral ascendancy" over their Italian counterpart.

Other sources instead dispute those claims, pointing out that, in the immediate aftermath of the battle, the moods of the two commanders were quite different. Campioni wrote that, even having been able to employ only two old refurbished battleships, the battle gave to every man in the fleet, from the senior officers to the seamen, the impression of being able to cope with the British Fleet on equal terms. Cunningham, conversely, was dismayed by the performance of his two older units, whose lack of speed permitted the Italians to dictate the course of the action, and whose guns were out-ranged not only by those of the two Italian battleships, but by those of the heavy cruisers as well.

Both capital ships were still undergoing trials, and  had suffered an electrical mishap on one of her main turrets. Littorio and  would have tipped the balance of fire well onto the Italian side.

Even without these ships the fleets were fairly even. Despite this, the air arm's battle reports were inflated to the point of claiming damage to half of the Allied fleet.

Overall, Allied gunnery proved superior, while the Italian salvos were too widely dispersed due to technical reasons that were not to be overcome until the end of the conflict.

Order of battle
(F) denotes flagship, (FD) division flagship, (FS) squadron flagship

Allies

Force A – Commanded by Vice Admiral John Tovey

7th Cruiser Squadron

 Force B – Commanded by Vice Admiral Andrew Cunningham who was the Commander in Chief Mediterranean Fleet;
 1 battleship:  (F)

Force C – Commanded by Vice-Admiral Sir Henry Pridham-Wippell.

1st Battle Squadron
 1 aircraft carrier: .

(in total, 3 battleships, 1 aircraft carrier, 5 light cruisers, 16 destroyers took part in the battle.)

Regia Marina

Italian force commanded by Admiral Inigo Campioni.
 (F)

Convoy Close Escort

2nd Light Cruiser Division
Vice-Admiral Ferdinando Casardi – Division Commander
 2 light cruisers: Giovanni delle Bande Nere, Bartolomeo Colleoni

10th Destroyer Squadron
Captain Franco Garofalo – Squadron Commander
 4 destroyers: Maestrale, Libeccio, Grecale, Scirocco

1st Fleet

Admiral Inigo Campioni – Commander

5th Battleship Division
Vice Admiral Bruto Brivonesi – Division Commander
 2 battleships:  (F),  (damaged)

4th (Light) Cruiser Division
Vice-Admiral Alberto Marenco di Moriondo – Division Commander
 4 light cruisers:  (F), 

8th (Light) Cruiser Division
Vice-Admiral Antonio Legnani – Division Commander
 2 light cruisers:  (FD), 

7th Destroyer Squadron
Commander Amleto Baldo – Squadron Commander
 4 destroyers:  (FS), 

8th Destroyer Squadron
Commander Luigi Liannazza – Squadron Commander
 4 destroyers:  (FS), 

15th Destroyer Squadron
Captain Paolo Melodia – Squadron Commander
 2 destroyers:  (FS), 

16th Destroyer Squadron
Captain Ugo Salvadori – Squadron Commander
 3 destroyers:  (FS), 

14th Destroyer Squadron
Captain Giovanni Galati – Squadron Commander
 3 destroyers:  (FS), 

2nd Fleet

Admiral Riccardo Paladini – Commander

1st (Heavy) Cruiser Division
Vice-Admiral Pellegrino Matteucci – Division Commander
 3 heavy cruisers:  (FD), 

3rd (Heavy) Cruiser Division
Vice-Admiral Carlo Cattaneo – Division Commander
 3 heavy cruisers: Pola (F),  (damaged)

7th (Light) Cruiser Division
Vice-Admiral Luigi Sansonetti – Division Commander
 4 light cruisers:  (FD), 

9th Destroyer Squadron
Captain Lorenzo Daretti – Squadron Commander
 4 destroyers:  (FS) (damaged), 

11th Destroyer Squadron
Captain Carlo Margottini – Squadron Commander
 4 destroyers:  (FS), 

12th Destroyer Squadron
Captain Carmine D'Arienzo – Squadron Commander
 4 destroyers:  (FS), 

(in total, 2 battleships, 6 heavy cruisers, 8 light cruisers, 23 destroyers took part in the battle.)

Notes

References

Sources
 Green, Jack & Massignani, Alessandro (1998). The Naval War in the Mediterranean, 1940–1943, Chatam Publishing, London. 
 Jordan, John (2008). Warship 2008. Conway maritime press, p. 34. 
 Miller, Nathan: War at Sea:  A Naval History of World War II, Oxford University Press, Oxford, 1995.  (Pbk.).

External links
 Naval-History.Net
 Battaglia di Punta Stilo – Plancia di Commando
 Despatch by Admiral Sir Andrew B. Cunningham
 OOB WWII Punto-Stilo/Calabria

Conflicts in 1940
1940 in Italy
Calabria
Malta Convoys
Battle of the Mediterranean
Naval battles of World War II involving Australia
Naval battles of World War II involving Italy
Calabria
Mediterranean convoys of World War II
July 1940 events
Stilo